Konstantin Drokov (born September 8, 1995) is a Russian ice hockey defenceman. He is currently playing with Metallurg Novokuznetsk of the Kontinental Hockey League (KHL).

Drokov made his Kontinental Hockey League debut playing with  Metallurg Novokuznetsk during the 2014–15 KHL season.

References

External links

1995 births
Living people
Metallurg Novokuznetsk players
Russian ice hockey defencemen
Sportspeople from Irkutsk